Kl. 10 is a song by Danish singer Medina from her third studio album For altid. It was released as the third single from the album on 31 October 2011. "Kl. 10" peaked at number one in Denmark for five consecutive weeks, becoming Medina's eighth number-one single.

Track listing
 Danish digital download
 "Kl. 10" – 4:04

Charts and certifications

Charts

Year-end charts

Certifications

Release history

References

External links
 

2011 singles
2010s ballads
Synth-pop ballads
Medina (singer) songs
Number-one singles in Denmark
Songs written by Jeppe Federspiel
Songs written by Rasmus Stabell
Songs written by Medina (singer)